Melksham railway station serves the town of Melksham in Wiltshire, England.

History 
The station opened with the original section of the line between Thingley Junction and Westbury, on 5 September 1848. British Railways closed the station from 18 April 1966 and soon afterwards the line through the station was singled, the station buildings demolished, and the up platform removed. The station reopened to passengers from 13 May 1985, although the short platform meant that trains longer than one carriage could not open all doors. In July 2018, the platform was improved and lengthened to cater for trains of up to three carriages.

The station had a siding which gave access to the former Wiltshire United Dairies/United Dairies creamery, last owned by Co-operative Wholesale Society Dairies, allowing access for milk trains. After its closure the dairy was converted into an industrial estate. From the 1960s to the mid-1980s there was a rail-served Shell oil depot at Melksham, run first by Jack Dean (oils) and later by Hartwells Oils. This received heating oil from a refinery at Llandarcy in west Wales but closed around 1983. During the 1970s, Foster Yeoman operated a roadstone terminal in the former goods yard which was rail-served from Merehead quarry. Wiltshire Farmers Ltd also had a private siding south of the station which was used until c.1989 for occasional deliveries of bagged fertiliser, but was removed in 1990.

Stationmasters

Charles Henry Tuckett 1856 (2 months) (afterwards station master at Brimscombe)
Alfred Matthews 1874 – 1895 (formerly station master at Chipping Norton)
H. Gerard 1896 – 1897
F.W. Cooper 1897 – 1899 (afterwards station master at Montpellier)
Edwin C. Beard 1899 – 1920 (afterwards station master at Chippenham)
A.M Taylor 1920 - 1925 (afterwards station master at Stroud)
A.E.C.P. Drew 1925 – 1934 (formerly station master at Challow, afterwards station master at Trowbridge)
W.H. Upton 1934 – 1942 (formerly station master at Savernake)
H.E. Sealy 1942 – 1956
D.R. Widdows from 1956 (formerly station master at Corsham)

Services

Between December 2006 and December 2013, Melksham station was served by two trains each way per day (one train on Sundays) between Swindon and Westbury, operated by First Great Western (now Great Western Railway), a reduction from five each way per day before the December 2006 timetable change.

Since December 2013, Melksham has a significantly improved service. Trains run approximately every two hours each way Mon-Sat (with peak period extras – nine departures in total) and seven trains each way on Sundays.

The Melksham single line serves as a diversionary route when either the Paddington-Westbury-Taunton or Taunton-Bristol Temple Meads-Bath routes are closed for engineering work or otherwise disrupted; occasional use is also made of the line by Freightliner trains running between Southampton and the Midlands when their normal route via Basingstoke and Reading is unavailable.  GWR's hourly Portsmouth Harbour-Cardiff Central services are sometimes diverted via Melksham to terminate and start at Swindon rather than Cardiff when engineering work is taking place between Bath, Bristol and the Severn Tunnel in connection with the electrification of the Great Western main line.  The effect of these diversions is that the local Westbury-Swindon 'Trans Wilts' service often has to be covered by a Rail Replacement bus service as there are insufficient paths available over the eight-mile single line section, due to a lack of intermediate signal sections.

A number of Mendip Rail aggregate trains from the quarries at Merehead and Whatley also use the line, serving destinations such as Appleford, Oxford Banbury Road, Wootton Bassett and Acton (London). A train of empty ballast hoppers operated by GB Railfreight runs most weekdays from Westbury via Melksham to Cliffe Hill Stud Farm in Leicestershire.

Facilities 
From summer 2015 a ticket vending machine has been in use on the platform, enabling passengers to either purchase their tickets or collect pre-paid tickets for their journey. An additional 20 free car parking spaces were provided at the same time, together with covered cycle accommodation, CCTV and a new passenger shelter.

As of 2020, there is a "next train" digital display on the station platform as well as a more detailed arrivals and departures screen in the adjoining car park. In that year the local Rail User Group turned a disused building close to the station into a café.

User groups
Melksham Railway Development Group formed in 1995, to promote Melksham Station and train journeys to and from Melksham. The group supported "Save the Train" and the TransWilts CRP over the years but has remained independent, running at least one special event every year. In 2015, the group was renamed the Melksham Rail User Group as with the success of their and other campaigns, passengers are now using the trains in greater numbers.

The "Save The Train" group was launched in 2005, to raise public awareness that services along the TransWilts Line were being reduced. Prior to the introduction of extra services in late 2013, "Save the Train" members transferred to the community element of the TransWilts Community Rail Partnership.

Community Rail
 
With Melksham being served by trains on the Swindon to Westbury route it comes under the remit of the TransWilts Community Interest Company (CIC) which is accredited by the Department for Transport.  As part of its Melksham Masterplan it is turning a disused building outside the station into a Hub including a café with toilets, cycle hire and EV charging points. 
 
The group has also taken out a lease on land adjacent to the station and laid it out for car parking.  Income from charges levied will be ploughed back into further improvements at the station.
 
It is also campaigning to extend the service to an hourly one continuing through via Salisbury to Southampton.

Services

References

External links
 
 
 

Railway stations in Wiltshire
Railway stations in Great Britain opened in 1848
Railway stations in Great Britain closed in 1966
Railway stations in Great Britain opened in 1985
Former Great Western Railway stations
Railway stations served by Great Western Railway
Beeching closures in England
Reopened railway stations in Great Britain
Melksham
1848 establishments in England
DfT Category F2 stations